Sikolo is a town in northern Ivory Coast. It is a sub-prefecture of Kong Department in Tchologo Region, Savanes District.

The far eastern portion of the sub-prefecture is within the borders of Comoé National Park.

Sikolo was a commune until March 2012, when it became one of 1126 communes nationwide that were abolished.

In 2014, the population of the sub-prefecture of Sikolo was 21,163.

Villages
The 27 villages of the sub-prefecture of Sikolo and their population in 2014 are:

Notes

Sub-prefectures of Tchologo
Former communes of Ivory Coast